Rita Nikolayevna Achkina (born 1 February 1938) is a retired Belarusian cross-country skier. In 1965 she won the 5 km, 10 km and 3 × 5 km relay events at the Soviet championships. Next year she earned two medals at the 1966 FIS Nordic World Ski Championships with a gold in the 3 × 5 km relay and a bronze in the 5 km. She competed in these two events at the 1968 Winter Olympics and won a bronze medal in the relay, placing sixth individually. After retiring from competitions she worked as elementary school teacher.

Cross-country skiing results
All results are sourced from the International Ski Federation (FIS).

Olympic Games
1 medal – (1 bronze)

World Championships
2 medals – (1 gold, 1 bronze)

References

External links

 
 

1938 births
Living people
People from Mogilev
Olympic bronze medalists for the Soviet Union
Belarusian female cross-country skiers
Soviet female cross-country skiers
Olympic cross-country skiers of the Soviet Union
Cross-country skiers at the 1964 Winter Olympics
Cross-country skiers at the 1968 Winter Olympics
Armed Forces sports society athletes
Olympic medalists in cross-country skiing
FIS Nordic World Ski Championships medalists in cross-country skiing
Medalists at the 1968 Winter Olympics
Honoured Masters of Sport of the USSR
Sportspeople from Mogilev Region